The 1985 Rothmans Grand Prix was a professional ranking snooker tournament that took place from 19 to 27 October 1985 at the Hexagon Theatre in Reading. A two table set-up meant that the televised stage at Reading could start at the last-32 stage.

The last-32 matches were played from 19 to 22 October. Tony Drago, in his first televised match, beat Eddie Charlton 5–3. Jimmy White beat Joe O'Boye 5–4 after trailing 2–4. Steve Longworth beat David Taylor 5–1. John Campbell made a tournament best break of 119 in the first frame of his match against Doug Mountjoy and took a 4–1 lead, before winning 5–2. Steve Davis beat Danny Fowler 5–1, Fowler making his television debut.

In the last-16 round, Peter Francisco make a century in the first frame of his match against Terry Griffiths. However Griffiths won the next three frames and eventually won 5–2. The following day, Steve Davis beat Alex Higgins 5–0, while Silvino Francisco beat Jimmy White 5–4 after winning the last three frames.

In the quarter-finals Steve Davis beat Silvino Francisco 5–2 despite losing two of the first three frames. Davis met Cliff Thorburn in the semi-finals, Thorburn beating Terry Griffiths 5–1. In the other half of the draw Dennis Taylor beat Cliff Wilson while Tony Knowles beat Kirk Stevens 5–4, the match going to the final black.

The final was a re-match of the 1985 World Championship final between Steve Davis and Dennis Taylor, the defending Grand Prix champion. Davis lead 6–1 at the end of the first session but Taylor fought back to lead 8–7 winning 6 consecutive frames. Eventually it was Davis this time who became champion winning 3 out of the last 4 frames to win 10–9. The match became the longest one-day final in snooker history. It lasted 10 hours and 21 minutes and it finished at 2.14am.

Main draw

Final

Qualifying
The leading 32 players started at the last 64 stage. Matches were over 9 frames. The final qualifying round took place in Bristol in September 1985.

   5–1   

   5–2   

   5–3   

   5–1   

   5–1   

   3–5   

   4–5   

   5–1   

   5–0   

   3–5   

   5–2   

   2–5   

   5–1   

   5–4   

   5–1   

   2–5   

   5–0   

   5–4   

   5–2   

   5–3   

   0–5   

   4–5   

   5–4   

   4–5   

   5–0   

   3–5   

   5–2   

   5–2   

   5–1   

   5-0   

   5–0   

   1–5

References 

1985
Grand Prix
Grand Prix